The 24th Shanghai Television Festival was held in Shanghai, China between June 11 and June 15, 2018.

List of winners and nominees
Winners are listed first and highlighted in bold.

References

External links
 List of Nominees 

Shanghai Television Festival
2018 television awards
2018 in Chinese television